The 2013 National Premier Leagues Grand Final was the first National Premier Leagues Grand Final. It was played on 13 October 2013 at KGV Park in Glenorchy between South Hobart and Sydney United 58. Sydney United 58 won 2–0 to secure their inaugural National Premier Leagues title.

Route to the final

Match

References

2010s in Tasmania
September 2013 sports events in Australia
Soccer in Tasmania
Grand finals